Russky Kameshkir is a rural locality (a selo) and the administrative center of Kameshkirsky District, Penza Oblast, Russia. Population:

References

Notes

Sources

Rural localities in Penza Oblast
Kuznetsky Uyezd (Saratov Governorate)